The West Siberian broadleaf and mixed forests, also known as the Western Siberian hemiboreal forests, is an ecoregion (WWF ID: PA0444) in Russia. It consists of a thin band of mixed forest along the southernmost edge of the West Siberian taiga (coniferous forests) in Western Siberia, and north of the forest steppe belt. The biodiversity of the zone is the highest in Siberia, due to its transitional position between many different ecoregions. The area acts as a long corridor for migration of animals along the east-west axis. The ecoregion is in the Palearctic realm, with a Humid Continental climate.

Location and description 
The ecoregion is an east-west strip, stretching  from Chelyabinsk in the west to Krasnoyarsk in the east. The zone is only  from north to south.   The Ob River and Irtysh River, and tributaries of those rivers, cross the region from south to north. The southeast of the region breaks up into low mountains.

Climate 
The region has a Humid continental climate (cool summer sub-type). The cool summer subtype is characterized by mild summers (no month averaging over 22 C), cold winters and less precipitation than the hot summer sub-type.  Mean temperatures range from -24° C (January) to +25° C (August).  Average annual precipitation is 390 mm.

Flora and fauna 
The forests of the region are dominated by Siberian fir (Abies sibirica), Siberian spruce (Picea obovata), Siberian pine (Pinus sibirica), Scots pine (Pinus sylvestris), and small-leafed Linden (Tilia cordata).  Recently, grassy areas have been covered by more Silver birch (Betula pendula) and Aspen (Populus tremula). About 20 percent of the region is swamp, most of which are eutropic. The canopy in these areas is White birch (Betula alba).

Protections 
There are no large federally protected areas in the ecoregion, and it has been heavily affected by human activities.

See also 
 List of ecoregions in Russia

References 

Ecoregions of Russia
Ecoregions of Asia
Palearctic ecoregions
Temperate broadleaf and mixed forests